Cindy König (born 15 August 1993) is a German professional footballer who plays as a forward for the German club SC Sand.

Club career 
König made her WE League for Nojima Stella debut on 12 September 2021.

References

External links
 

1993 births
Living people
German women's footballers
Women's association football forwards
Frauen-Bundesliga players
WE League players
SV Werder Bremen (women) players
S.C. Braga (women's football) players
Nojima Stella Kanagawa Sagamihara players
SC Sand players
German expatriate women's footballers
Expatriate women's footballers in Portugal
Expatriate women's footballers in Japan
German expatriate sportspeople in Japan
Sportspeople from Bremerhaven
Footballers from Bremen (state)